El Destino may refer to:

 El Destino Plantation, an American cotton plantation established in 1828
 "El Destino" (song), by Juan Gabriel and Rocío Dúrcal, 1997

See also
El destino se disculpa, a 1945 Spanish drama film